Metasesarma obesum, also known as the marble crab or marble Batik crab, is a species of sesarmid crab. It is a semiterrestrial and brackish-water crab that lives on sandy beaches.

Distribution
Metasesarma obesum is known from the shores of the Indian and Pacific Oceans.

Description

In aquaria 
They are occasionally found in the aquarium trade. They require land area, hiding places such as leaf litter or driftwood, and shallow brackish/salt water. It is omnivorous and generally peaceful to tankmates and conspecifics, however it might fight with conspecifics if it does not have enough space.

References 

Grapsoidea
Crustaceans of the Indian Ocean
Crustaceans of the Pacific Ocean
Crustaceans described in 1851
Taxa named by James Dwight Dana